Cheris Kramarae is a scholar in the area of women's studies and communication, with her research primarily focusing on gender, language and communication, technology, and education. She is mostly known for her contributions to muted group theory, as well as A Feminist Dictionary, in which she was a co-author.

Early life and education 
Karmarae received a B.S. from South Dakota State University, an M.A. from Ohio University and, in 1975, a Ph.D. in communication and social linguistics from University of Illinois, Urbana-Champaign. She is currently a visiting professor at the Center for the Study of Women in Society at the University of Oregon, as well as a professor emerita in communication and gender studies at the University of Illinois, Urbana-Champaign.

Teaching career 
Upon completing her doctorate, Kramarae accepted a position in 1978 at the University of Illinois Urbana as an associate professor, teaching speech communication through 1985. In 1988, she moved on to the University of Oregon, where she was the acting director for the Center for the Study of Women in Society.

From 1991 to 1996, Kramarae was at the University of Illinois, where she was the co-founder and co-organizer of the Women, Information Technology & Scholarship (WITS) Center for Advanced Study. She was also the director of the Women's Studies program at the University of Illinois, beginning in 1993, as well as Jubilee Professor or Liberal Arts & Social Sciences at the University of Illinois.

She is currently a visiting professor for the Center for the Study of Women in Society, at the University of Oregon, where she has been since 1996.

She worked as the International Dean at the Women's University in Germany.

Research 
Kramarae's research has been primarily focused on gender, language, communication, technology, and education. Her research focuses on taking a look at women experience in higher education. With her research, she has published many books and articles on the concepts of women communication via technology, and how that can differ between genders. Kramarae is mostly known though, for her contributions to muted group theory, as well as A Feminist Dictionary.

Muted Group Theory 
Kramarae is most widely known for her contributions to muted group theory (MTG). This theory looks at power and how different groups use it. This theory begins with the premise that language is culture-based, and since men are seen to have more power than women, men have been seen to have power over language, resulting with a male-biased language. MTG breaks down into three assumptions:
 Men and women perceive the world differently because they have different perception shaping experiences.
 Men enact their power politically, using their power to suppress women's ideas from gaining public awareness.
 Women must then convert their voices into language that is considered male.
Upon this definition of MGT, Kramarae made the widely accepted claim that language is a tool made by men and used by a dominant culture to marginalize other groups and to deter them from full participation in their given societies.

A Feminist Dictionary 
Kramarae is also well known for co-authoring A Feminist Dictionary. This is an alternative dictionary compiled by Kramarae, Ann Russo, and Paula Treichler. This dictionary includes over 2,500 separate words and definitions from a feminist perspective. This book has since been reprinted as Amazons, Bluestockings and Crones: A Feminist Dictionary.

Activism 
In 1977,  became an associate of the Women's Institute for Freedom of the Press (WIFP). WIFP is an American nonprofit publishing organization. The organization works to increase communication between women and connect the public with forms of women-based media.

Selected publications 
 Henly, N. M., Kramarae, C., & Thorne, B. (1983). Language, gender, and society. New York, NY: Newbury House Publishers
 Kramarae, C. (1980). Women and men speaking. New York, NY: Newbury House Publishers
 Kramarae, C., Russo, A., & Treichler, P. (1985) A feminist dictionary. London, UK: Rivers Oram Press
 Kramarae, C. (1988). Technology and women's voices. Abingdon, UK: Taylor & Francis
 Kramarae, C., Russo, A., & Treichler, P. (1992) Amazons, bluestockings, and crones: A woman's companion to word's and ideas. Abingdon, UK: Routledge
 Kramarae, C. (2000). Routledge international encyclopedia of women: Global women's issues and knowledge. Abingdon, UK: Routledge
 Kramarae, C. (2001). The third shift: Women learning online. Washington, DC: American Association of University Women Educational Foundation

See also
 Feminism
 Women's studies

References

Year of birth missing (living people)
Living people
American feminists
Dakota people
Ohio University alumni
South Dakota State University alumni
University of Illinois Urbana-Champaign alumni
University of Illinois Urbana-Champaign faculty
University of Oregon faculty
Writers from South Dakota